Iodine Recordings is an independent record label based in Boston, Massachusetts, United States. Iodine Recordings releases punk, hardcore, and indie rock music. It was once home to bands such as Brand New, Orange Island, Smoke or Fire (Jericho RVA), There Were Wires, Gregor Samsa, and more.

Iodine started as a record distribution company in 1996 formed by Casey Horrigan. Iodine later evolved into a record label with its first release in 2000, a compilation CD titled "Ghost in the Gears" featuring popular hardcore bands such as Converge, Cave In, Zegota, and Good Clean Fun. Reuben Bettsack (singer of The Nationale Blue) purchased half the label in 2001 becoming co-owner and vice president of the company. Iodine soon started signing local and national artists of all different genres, and developed into a well known label. Iodine also put on a very popular annual music festival in Boston called Iodine Fest which showcased many popular indie and hardcore acts. In 2003 Iodine had its biggest release year, a total of eight records. Facing financial hardships and lack of sales to support these new releases, Iodine had to announce its closing at the end of 2003.

Some Iodine bands moved on and had some great success. Brand New signed to Triple Crown Records/Interscope Records, Orange Island released two records on Triple Crown Records and Rise Records, Smoke or Fire signed to Fat Wreck Chords, Gregor Samsa has signed to Kora Records and has a new CD as well as a split LP with Red Sparowes on Robotic Empire, and There Were Wires went on to form new bands like Disappearer and Doomriders (Deathwish Inc.).

In late 2020, Iodine Recordings announced that it would be re-launching with new releases slated for 2021.

Label discography

As of September 2022, Iodine Recordings' discography includes over 50 releases from over 30 different bands. Its main discography most prominently features releases from Brand New, Smoke or Fire, Jeromes Dream, and Onelinedrawing.

In March 2021, Iodine Recordings uploaded its entire catalog onto the music streaming/purchasing service, Bandcamp.

Label artists

Current 

 Attempt Survivors
 Audio Karate
 Best Ex
 The Darling Fire
 Drowningman
 Her Head's On Fire
 Hey Thanks!
 The Iron Roses (Nathan Gray & The Iron Roses)
 Jeromes Dream
 Light Tower
 Onelinedrawing
 Orange Island
 Ritual Earth
 Smoke or Fire
 Stretch Arm Strong
 There Were Wires

Affiliated and Former 

 Agent Eighty Four (Agent 84)
 Aim Of Conrad
 Blue/Green Heart
  Brand New
 Garrison
 Good Band Name
 Gregor Samsa (On Hiatus)
 Jericho RVA (Changed name to Smoke Or Fire)
 Quicksand
 The Moomaw Collective
 The Nationale Blue

Records never released

The following records were recorded and produced, though were never released due to the reasons listed.

 Agent 84 - War is Peace, Freedom is Slavery, Ignorance is Strength LP (1998) - Not released due to band breaking up.
 American Nightmare/Hassan I Sabbah - Split 7 inch EP - Not released due to recording complications.
 Orange Island - Somnia Singles 7 inch EP (2002) - Not released due to lack of funds.
 Garrison/Orange Island - split album CDEP (2002) - Eventually released on Lonesome Recordings
 Orange Island - The Tease CDEP (2003) - Not released due to Iodine's closing.

Shortly before Iodine's closing the label had planned to release new records by: The Faux, Smoke or Fire, Aim of Conrad, Eulcid, and The Nationale Blue. Iodine Recordings closed before these albums were recorded, and some of the artists recorded and released under a new record label.

The Rebirth of Iodine Recordings 

After the closure of Iodine Recordings, Casey left the music scene to hike the Appalachian Trail and travel the world. In early 2021, Iodine Recordings came back after seventeen years of inactivity. Casey had reconnected with old friends and bands, and had the idea to revitalize the underground label. The catalyst being There Were Wires who wanted to see their album Somnambulists re-released on vinyl. 

Since the rebirth of the label, they have put out albums from bands such as Smoke Or Fire, Audio Karate, Hey Thanks!, and Onelinedrawing. These include re-releases, compilations, and new albums.

References

External links
 Official Iodine Recordings Website
 Official Iodine Recordings Store at Deathwish Inc.
 Iodine Recordings YouTube Channel
 Official Iodine Recordings Instagram Account
 Iodine Recordings Bandcamp Page
 
 
 

Record labels established in 1996
American independent record labels
Indie rock record labels
Post-hardcore record labels
Emo
Hardcore record labels
Alternative rock record labels
Companies based in Boston
Punk record labels
Heavy metal record labels
Doom metal record labels
Grindcore record labels
Record labels based in Massachusetts